Henry Delisle (20 April 1938 – 18 April 2022) was a French academic and politician. He served as a Member of Parliament in the National Assembly for Calvados's 2nd constituency from 1981 to 1986. Delisle died in Caen on 18 April 2022 at the age of 83.

Decorations
Officer of the National Order of the Legion of Honour
Commander of the Order of Agricultural Merit
Honorary Knight Commander of the Most Distinguished Order of Saint Michael and Saint George

Works
Culture rurale, cultures urbaines ?
Si vous aimez le Parti Socialiste, quittez le !

References

1938 births
2022 deaths
People from Manche
Deputies of the 7th National Assembly of the French Fifth Republic
Socialist Party (France) politicians
Officiers of the Légion d'honneur
Recipients of the Order of Agricultural Merit
Knights Commander of the Order of St Michael and St George
Mayors of places in Normandy
Politicians from Normandy